James Robert Maxwell (June 9, 1902 – August 15, 1985) was an American runner. He competed at the 1928 Olympics in the 400 m hurdles, but failed to reach the final. As a student of Pomona College he won the AAU 220 yard hurdles title in 1927 and 1930–1931.

References

External links 

 

1902 births
1985 deaths
Athletes (track and field) at the 1928 Summer Olympics
Olympic track and field athletes of the United States
American male hurdlers
Pomona College alumni